The Cheviot is an extinct volcano and the highest summit in the Cheviot Hills and in the county of Northumberland.

The Cheviot was formed when melting in the crust over 390 million years ago gave rise to volcanic activity, and it has subsequently sustained intense erosion. Several watercourses radiate from The Cheviot.

Etymology
The name Cheviot, which was first documented in 1181 as Chiuiet, is probably of Brittonic origin. The name involves the element *ceμ-, meaning "a ridge", and the nominal suffix -ed, which in place-names can mean "having the quality of".

Geography 
The summit is a triangular plateau covered with peat quagmires.

Usway Burn, a tributary of the Coquet, rises on The Cheviot, as do College Burn, which merges with the Bowmont Water to form the River Glen near Kirk Newton, and Harthope Burn.

Geology 

The Cheviot is an extinct stratovolcano eruptive during the Caledonian orogeny (490-390 Ma), in which volcanic activity arose from melting within the mantle crust. Volcanic vents may have been located along the faults at Harthope and Thirl Moor. The earliest volcanic activity in the area was violent and explosive, with exposed ash and ignimbrite showing pyroclastic flows to have reached Coquetdale and Ingram. Lavas erupted from the Cheviot underlie Branxton and Flodden Ridge.

Granitic magma was intruded into the layers of lava during the time period immediately before the volcano became inactive. The resulting  pluton was exposed by erosion during the Carboniferous (+298 Ma).

Glacial till in common in the area, which is a remnant of the Last Ice Age (< 115 Ka), during which the Cheviots were beneath ice sheets. The peat expanses date from the immediately post-glacial period.

Human history 
Flattened remnants of a Neolithic henge monument have been uncovered at nearby Hethpool.  The stone circle may date to around 2500 BC, and is hypothesized to have been a ritualistic gateway to the mountain.

Harthope Burn, which cuts a deep valley on the flanks of The Cheviot, marked the boundary between the reivers of the English East and Middle Marches in the 16th and 17th century.

During World War II, The Cheviot and the hills surrounding it were the site of aircraft crashes which claimed the lives both of Allied and German airmen. A local shepherd John Dagg and his sheepdog rescued a pilot following an RAF crash in 1942. Dagg also rescued survivors of a crash in December 1944, which killed 2 members of a 9-man US Air Force crew. Aircraft wreckage is still seen on the mountain today.

Access 
Other than the route via the Pennine Way, most routes up the Cheviot start from the Harthope Burn side to the northeast, which provides the nearest access by road. There are routes following the ridges above either side of the valley, and a route that sticks to the valley floor until it climbs to the summit of the Cheviot from the head of the valley.

View
The view is obscured greatly by the flatness of the summit plateau. Nevertheless, on a clear day the following are visible (from west, clockwise); Broad Law, Moorfoot Hills, Pentland Hills, the Ochils, Lammermuir Hills, Ros Hill, Long Crag, Urra Moor, Tosson Hill, Burnhope Seat, Cross Fell, Helvellyn, Scafell Pike, Skiddaw, Sighty Crag, Peel Fell, and Queensberry. The longest possible line of sight from the Cheviot is to Beinn a' Ghlò, 112 miles away in the Grampians of the Scottish Highlands.

Subsidiary SMC summits

References

External links
 Computer generated summit panorama The Cheviot

Cheviot Hills
Marilyns of England
Hewitts of England
Hills of Northumberland
Nuttalls
Sites of Special Scientific Interest in Northumberland
Highest points of English counties
Stratovolcanoes
Volcanoes of England
Devonian volcanoes
Kirknewton, Northumberland